Monostichella coryli is a plant pathogen infecting hazelnuts.

References

External links 
 Index Fungorum
 USDA ARS Fungal Database

Fungal plant pathogens and diseases
Hazelnut tree diseases
Dermateaceae
Taxa named by John Baptiste Henri Joseph Desmazières